Anca Juli or Ancajuli is a small town in the Tucumán Province in the department of Tafi Viejo in northern Argentina.

Location

Anca Juli is located 60 km northwest of the city of San Miguel de Tucumán.

Toponym
There is a Cacán etymology attached to the meaning of Anca Juli which may be translated in that language as birthplace of eagles.

Geography
It is surrounded by high mountains up to 5000 m on the eastern slopes of the Calchaquíes Summits. The small village is characterized by its large river (good for trout fishing) and varied wildlife that roams the river.

Populated places in Tucumán Province